In Balkans folklore, dhampirs (sometimes spelled dhampyres, dhamphirs, or dhampyrs) are creatures that are the result of a union between a vampire and a human. This union was usually between male vampires and female humans, with stories of female vampires mating with male humans being rare.

Etymology
The word "dhampir" is an Albanian loanword borrowed from the Serbian original word "vampire". Vladimir Orel points out the similarity between Proto-Albanian *pīja and the Proto-Slavic cognate *pijǫ.

Nomenclature
The word "dhampir" is associated with Balkan folklore, as described by T. P. Vukanović. In the rest of the region, terms such as Serbian vampirović, vampijerović, vampirić (thus, Bosnian lampijerović, etc.) literally meaning "vampire's son", are used.

In other regions the child is named "Vampir" if a boy and "Vampirica" if a girl, or "Dhampir" if a boy and "Dhampirica" if a girl.  In Bulgarian folklore, numerous terms such as glog (lit. "hawthorn"), vampirdzhiya ("vampire" + nomen agentis suffix), vampirar ("vampire" + nomen agentis suffix), dzhadadzhiya and svetocher are used to refer to vampire children and descendants, as well as to other specialized vampire hunters. Dhampiraj is also an Albanian surname.

Origin
In the Balkans it was believed that male vampires have a great desire for human women, so a vampire will return to have intercourse with his wife or with a woman he was attracted to in life.  In one case, a Serbian widow tried to blame her pregnancy on her late husband, who had supposedly become a vampire, and there were cases of Serbian men pretending to be vampires in order to reach the women they desired. In Bulgarian folklore, vampires were sometimes said to deflower virgins as well.  The sexual activity of the vampire seems to be a peculiarity of South Slavic vampire belief as opposed to other Slavs, although a similar motif also occurs in Belarusian legends.

Powers
Legends state that dhampirs were, for the most part, normal members of the community.  But dhampirs, especially male, of paternal vampire descent could see invisible vampires and practice sorcery, often starting careers as vampire hunters, which would be practiced for generations from father to son. According to the legend, dhampyres have the powers of both humans and vampires: they can sense a supernatural creature within a specified distance, have acute sense of sight and hearing, have regenerating abilities, immortality, can walk in sunlight (which led to the adoption of the sobriquet "Daywalker"), eat like a human, can control animals, and can be used to destroy vampires. One unique distinction between vampires and dhampirs is that a dhampir’s blood is very acidic towards vampires and can melt any part or the complete body of a vampire.

Features
Some traditions specify signs by which the children of a vampire can be recognized.  Albanian legends state they have untamed dark or black hair and are very cunning or courageous in nature. They are not attracted to blood and can eat normally like other human beings. They also are not vulnerable to sunlight.  In Bulgarian folklore, possible indications include being "very dirty", having a soft body, no nails or bones (the latter physical peculiarity is also ascribed to the vampire itself), and "a deep mark on the back, like a tail."  In contrast, a pronounced nose was often a sign, as were larger than normal ears, teeth or eyes.  According to J. Gordon Melton, from his book, The Vampire Book: The Encyclopedia of the Undead, in some areas, a true dhampir possessed a "slippery, jelly-like body and lived only a short life—a belief... that vampires have no bones."

See also 
 List of dhampirs
 List of vampires
 List of vampiric creatures in folklore
 Cambion – a half-demon

References 

Albanian legendary creatures
Bulgarian folklore
Corporeal undead

Fictional vampire hunters
Fictional vampire types
Serbian mythology
Slavic legendary creatures
Vampires
Fictional Serbian people
Slavic folklore characters
Romanian legendary creatures
North Macedonia folklore